Palmira is a corregimiento in Boquete District, Chiriquí Province, Panama. Its population as of 1990 was 2,043; its population as of 2000 was 1,513. There are three urban areas with some limited housing density. They are Palmira Centro, Palmira Arriba and Palmira Abajo. Palmira is blessed with excellent soil, abundant rivers and creeks and grows a variety of vegetables, fruits and coffee. There is also some meat production.

References

Corregimientos of Chiriquí Province